Gosport Borough Council is the local authority for the borough of Gosport, in the county of Hampshire, England. The council consists of 28 councillors, two or three for each of the 14 wards in the town. It is currently controlled by the Liberal Democrats, led by Peter Chegwyn. The borough council is based at Gosport Town Hall.

History 
Gosport was historically part of the parish of Alverstoke. Gosport's first form of local government was a body of improvement commissioners known as the "Gosport Town Trustees", established in 1763. In 1874 the town trustees were replaced by a Local Board (also known as the Urban Sanitary Authority) and the local government district was enlarged to cover the whole parish of Alverstoke, and so the new body was called the "Alverstoke Local Board". The loss of the Gosport name from its governing body was a subject of ongoing debate in the area for some years afterwards, and in 1891 the local board was renamed the "Gosport and Alverstoke Local Board".

Under the Local Government Act 1894, urban sanitary authorities such as the Gosport and Alverstoke Local Board were reconstituted as urban districts, and so the council became the "Gosport and Alverstoke Urban District Council". On 9 November 1922 the urban district was made a municipal borough and the Alverstoke name was removed from its title, and so the council became "Gosport Borough Council". On 1 April 1974 the district became a non-metropolitan district, altering its powers and responsibilities but keeping the same area and name.

Political structure
Following the 2022 Borough Council elections, the political structure of the council is as follows:

See also 
 Gosport Borough Council elections

References

External links 
 

Non-metropolitan district councils of England
Local authorities in Hampshire
Borough Council